Carbon is a town in Eastland County, Texas, United States. The population was 272 at the 2010 census, up from 224 at the 2000 census.

Geography

Demographics

As of the census of 2000, there were 224 people, 98 households, and 68 families residing in the town. The population density was 219.6 people per square mile (84.8/km2). There were 120 housing units at an average density of 117.7 per square mile (45.4/km2). The racial makeup of the town was 92.41% White, 5.36% from other races, and 2.23% from two or more races. Hispanic or Latino of any race were 7.14% of the population.

There were 98 households, out of which 27.6% had children under the age of 18 living with them, 62.2% were married couples living together, 6.1% had a female householder with no husband present, and 30.6% were non-families. 27.6% of all households were made up of individuals, and 15.3% had someone living alone who was 65 years of age or older. The average household size was 2.29 and the average family size was 2.79.

In the town, the population was spread out, with 19.6% under the age of 18, 8.9% from 18 to 24, 21.4% from 25 to 44, 29.0% from 45 to 64, and 21.0% who were 65 years of age or older. The median age was 44 years. For every 100 females, there were 107.4 males. For every 100 females age 18 and over, there were 104.5 males.

The median income for a household in the town was $29,375, and the median income for a family was $33,750. Males had a median income of $21,500 versus $12,500 for females. The per capita income for the town was $13,299. About 4.8% of families and 8.5% of the population were below the poverty line, including 3.6% of those under the age of eighteen and 7.1% of those 65 or over.

Education
The town of Carbon is served by the Eastland Independent School District. On July 1, 1990, the Eastland district absorbed the Carbon Independent School District. The Carbon High School was closed in 1990 due to a lack of students attending.

Notable events
On March 17, 2022, the Eastland Texas Wildfire Complex ravaged the town and fully burned several homes, buildings, and vehicles.

Notable people

 Thomas G. Morris, Congressman of New Mexico; born in Carbon

References

Towns in Eastland County, Texas
Towns in Texas